Supreme Volleyball Club   is a Thai professional women's volleyball club based in ฺBangkok and have managed by Supreme Volleyball Club Co.,Ltd. which was a subsidiary of Supreme Distribution (Thailand) Co., Ltd. The club was founded in 2009 as Supreme Nakhon Si Thammarat before reformed in to Supreme Chonburi in 2013.

Supreme Volleyball Club won their first Thailand League title in 2016–17, the AVC Club Volleyball Championship title in 2017, and the Super League in 2017.

Honours

Domestic competitions

League
  Thailand League :
 Champion (3): 2016–17, 2017–18, 2019–20
  Runner-up (4): 2011–12, 2015–16, 2018–19,2021–22
 Third (1): 2020–21
  Thai-Denmark Super League :
 Champion (3): 2017, 2018, 2019
  Runner-up (2): 2013, 2016

Youth League
  Academy League
 Runner-up (4): 2015, 2017, 2018, 2020
4th place (1): 2019
5th place (1): 2016

International competitions

Major
  World Championship 1 appearance 
2018 — 8th
  Asian Championship 4 appearances 
2017 —   Champion
 2018 —   Champion
 2019 —   Runner-up
 2020 —  did not qualify because Outbreak of Covid-19 in the world
 2021 —  Third

Minor
  VTV International Cup 
2016 —  Champion

Former team names 

Supreme Nakhon Si Thammarat  (2009–2013)
Supreme Chonburi  (2013–2014)
Supreme Chonburi-E.Tech  (2014–2018)
Generali Supreme Chonburi-E.Tech  (2018–2020)
Supreme Chonburi-E.Tech  (2020–2022)
Supreme TIP (Dhiphaya) Chonburi-E.Tech  (2022–present)

Team colors 
Thailand League

    (2011–2012)
    (2012–2013)
     (2013–2014)
     (2014–2015)
     (2015–2016)
    (2016–17)
    (2017–18)
    (2018–19)
    (2019–21)
     (2021–present)

Thai-Denmark Super League

    (2013)
    (2014)
    (2015)
    (2016)
    (2017)
    (2018)
    (2019)

League results

Crest
The club logo incorporates elements from their nickname; The Pink Dolphine and their owner; Supreme Distribution (Thailand) Co., Ltd.

Stadium and locations

Team roster 2022–23 
As of January 2023

Team staff 
As of February 2020

2022–23 Results and fixtures

Thailand League

First leg

Second leg

Final

Imports

Head coach

Team Captains

Club player award

Notable players

Domestic players

 Pornpimol Kunbang
 Wannaporn Pichprom
 Utaiwan Kaensing
 Chutima Srisaikaew
 Rattanaporn Sanuanram
 Chatchu-on Moksri
 Thipvimon Pookongnam
 Chamaiporn Phokha
 Bualee Jaroensri
 Kullapa Piampongsan (loan form Khonkaen stars)
 Nootsara Tomkom
 Napatsorn Ammarinrat
 Thanacha Suksod
 Wilavan Apinyapong (break from volleyball)
 Ajcharaporn Kongyot (loan to Sarıyer Belediyespor)
 Wipawee Srithong 
 Nampueng Khamart
 Pimtawan Thongyos

Foreign players

 Alaina Bergsma (2015)
 Deedee Harrison (2015)
 Ashley Frazier (2015–2016)
 Chloe Mann (2016–2017)
 Sareea Freeman (2017–2018)
 Taylor Sandbothe (2018)

 Márcia Fusieger (2015–2016)

 Misao Tanyama (2014)

 Karmen Kočar (2015–2016)

 Fatou Diouck (2016–2017), (2018)

 Aleoscar Blanco (2017–2018)

 Mercy Moim (2018–2019)

 Aprilia Manganang (2019)
 Megawati Hangestri Pertiwi (2020–2021)

 Wang Na (2018–2019)
 Zhang Xiaoya (2019–2020)
 Jie Sun (2019–2020)
 Che Wenhan (2022-2023)

 Yeliz Basa (2022–2023)

References

External links
 Official fanpage

Volleyball clubs in Thailand
2009 establishments in Thailand
Women's volleyball teams
Volleyball clubs established in 2009